Bamboo shoots or bamboo sprouts are the edible shoots (new bamboo culms that come out of the ground) of many bamboo species including Bambusa vulgaris and Phyllostachys edulis. They are used as vegetables in numerous Asian dishes and broths. They are sold in various processed shapes, and are available in fresh, dried, and canned versions.

Raw bamboo shoots contain cyanogenic glycosides, natural toxins also contained in cassava.  The toxins must be destroyed by thorough cooking and for this reason fresh bamboo shoots are boiled before being used in other ways.  The toxins are also destroyed in the canning process.

Harvested species
Most young shoots of bamboo are edible after being boiled to remove toxins, but only around a hundred or so species are harvested regularly for edible shoots. These are usually from species that are also cultivated for other uses. These include:
Acidosasa – native to South China and Vietnam
Acidosasa edulis – endemic to the provinces of Fujian, Zhejiang and Jiangxi, China.
Acidosasa chinensis – endemic to Guangdong, China
Bambusa – the most commonly harvested bamboo in tropical and subtropical Asia, occurring from the Philippines to India, and from Sumatra to southern China.
Bambusa balcooa – native to the Indian subcontinent to Mainland Southeast Asia
Bambusa bambos – native to South Asia
Bambusa beecheyana – native to South China to Mainland Southeast Asia and Taiwan
Bambusa blumeana – native to Island Southeast Asia
Bambusa gibboides – native to Guangdong, China
Bambusa merrilliana – endemic to the Philippines
Bambusa odashimae – endemic to Taiwan
Bambusa oldhamii – native to Taiwan and South China
Bambusa polymorpha – native to Mainland Southeast Asia, Bangladesh, and northeastern India.
Bambusa philippinensis – endemic to the Philippines
Bambusa tulda – native to the Himalayas region, Yunnan, and northern Mainland Southeast Asia
Bambusa tuldoides – native to Guangdong, Guangxi, and northern Mainland Southeast Asia
Bambusa vulgaris – native to Mainland Southeast Asia and Yunnan, China
Chimonobambusa – native to the Himalayas, Mainland Southeast Asia, China, and Japan
Dendrocalamus – native to tropical South Asia, Southeast Asia, and South China
Dendrocalamus asper – native to Southeast Asia
Dendrocalamus latiflorus – native to South China and Taiwan
Dendrocalamus membranaceus – native to tropical Southeast Asia
Dendrocalamus strictus – native to tropical Southeast Asia and India
Gigantochloa – native to tropical Asia
Gigantochloa atter – native to Island Southeast Asia
Gigantochloa levis – native to Island Southeast Asia
Phyllostachys – native from the Himalayas to East Asia
Phyllostachys edulis – native to South China and Taiwan
Phyllostachys bambusoides – native to China, Taiwan, and Japan
Phyllostachys rivalis – endemic to China
Phyllostachys vivax – endemic to China
Sasa – native to Korea, Japan, and eastern Russia (Sakhalin)
Sasa kurilensis – native to Korea, Japan, and eastern Russia (Sakhalin)

Freshly collected bamboo shoots is a good source of thiamine, niacin, vitamin A, vitamin B6, and vitamin E. 17 different amino acids have been reported, 8 of them essential for humans. The amount of amino acids in canned and fermented shoots is lower than when freshly prepared.

Regional uses

East Asia
In certain parts of Japan, China and Taiwan, shoots from the giant timber bamboo Bambusa oldhamii are harvested in spring or early summer. Young shoots from this species are highly sought after due to their crisp texture and sweet taste. Older shoots, however, have an acrid flavor and should be sliced thin and boiled in a large volume of water several times. The sliced bamboo is edible after boiling.  B. oldhamii is more widely known as a noninvasive landscaping bamboo.

Pickled bamboo, used as a condiment, may also be made from the pith of the young shoots.  In Japan, menma is a common topping for ramen noodle soup.  In China, luosifen river snail noodles, a popular dish from Guangxi, get their famously pungent smell from pickled bamboo shoots.

South Asia

In Nepal, they are used in dishes which have been well known in Nepal for centuries. A popular dish is tama (fermented bamboo shoot), with potato and beans. An old popular song in Nepali mentions tama as "my mother loves vegetable of recipe containing potato, beans, and tama".  Some varieties of bamboo shoots commonly grown in the Sikkim Himalayas of India are Dendrocalamus hamiltonii, Dendrocalamus sikkimensis and Bambusa tulda locally known as choya bans, bhalu bans and karati bans. These are edible when young. These bamboo shoots are collected, defoliated and boiled in water with turmeric powder for 10–15 minutes to remove the bitter taste of the bamboo after which the tama is ready for consumption. Tama is commonly sold in local markets during the months of June to September when young bamboo shoots sprout.

In Assam, bamboo shoots are part of traditional Assamese cuisine. They are called khorisa and bah gaj in Assamese and "hen-up" in Karbi in Assam.

In Karnataka, Andhra Pradesh, and Northern Tamilnadu, the bamboo shoots are used as a special dish during the monsoons (due to seasonal availability). It is common in Tulunadu and Malnad regions. It goes by the name kanile or 'kalale in Tulu, Veduru Kommulu in Telugu, and Moongil Kuruthu in Tamil. The shoots are usually sliced and soaked in water for two to three days, after which the water is drained and replenished each day to extricate and remove toxins. It is also used as a pickle. It is consumed as a delicacy by all communities in the region. 

In the Diyun region of Arunachal Pradesh, the Chakma people call them bashchuri. The fermented version is called medukkeye, and is often served fried with pork. The bamboo shoots can also be fermented and stored with vinegar.

In Jharkhand, India, the bamboo shoots used as vegetable. Young shoot and stored shoots are known as karil and shandhna respectively.

In the western part of Odisha, India, they are known as karadi and are used in traditional curries such as Ambila, pithou bhaja and pickle. In monsoon, it can be abundantly found in Bamboo forest of Karlapat wildlife sanctuary and mostly prepared in homes using mustard paste. They can be stored for months in an air tight container. They are also dried in sun increasing their shelf life and these dried shoots are called Hendua. The dried shoots are used in curries of roasted fish, called Poda Macha.

In Nagaland, India, bamboo shoots are both cooked and eaten as a fresh food item or fermented for a variety of culinary uses. Fermented bamboo shoot is commonly known as bas tenga. Cooking pork with a generous portion of fermented bamboo shoot is very popular in Naga cuisine. 

In Manipur, India, they are known as u-soi. They are also fermented and preserved after which they are known as soibum. They are used in a wide variety of dishes – among which are iromba, ooti and kangshu etc.  The fermented bamboo shoot which is preserved for many months is known as soijin. Soijin can be stored up to 10 years in Andro village. Generally, soijin or usoi is in a big basket made of bamboo. However, they are stored in earthen pot in Andro village.

In Meghalaya Bamboo shoots are either used fresh or fermented and made into pickles, soups with pork or dried fish, or curried and seasoned with sesame seeds or made into a sauce with fermented fish. It sometimes cooked along with yam leaves and dried fish.

In Chittagong Hill Tracts, Bangladesh, bamboo shoots are a traditional food of the indigenous Jumma people. The preparation of their dishes consist of several steps. First, bamboo shoots are collected from the bamboo forest then defoliated and boiled in water. Afterwards, the bamboo shoot is prepared with shrimp paste, chili, garlic paste, and salt.

Southeast Asia

In the Philippines, bamboo shoots are primarily harvested from bolo bamboo (Gigantochloa levis), giant bamboo (Dendrocalamus asper), common bamboo (Bambusa vulgaris), spiny bamboo (Bambusa blumeana), and two endemic species, bayog (Bambusa merrilliana) and laak (Bambusa philippinensis). Other economically important species also harvested for bamboo shoots include kayali (Gigantochloa atter), male bamboo (Dendrocalamus strictus), and climbing bamboos (Dinochloa spp.) Another endemic species, the lumampao or bagakay bamboo (Schizostachyum lumampao), which are used for making sawali (woven bamboo strips), are also occasionally harvested for bamboo shoots. In Filipino cuisine, the shoots are commonly called labóng (other names include rabong, dabong, or tambo).  The two most popular dishes for these are ginataáng labóng (shoots in coconut milk and chilies) and dinengdeng na labóng (shoots in fish bagoóng and stew of string beans, saluyot, and tinapa). They are also sautéed alone or with other ingredients as in paklay, or cooked as fried or fresh lumpia. Bamboo shoots are also preserved as atchara, traditional sweet pickles that are often made from papaya.

In Thai cuisine bamboo shoots are called no mai. It can be used in stir-fries, soups such as tom kha kai, curries such as kaeng tai pla, as well as in salads such as sup no-mai. Some dishes ask for fresh bamboo shoots, others for pickled bamboo shoots (no mai dong).

In Vietnamese cuisine, shredded bamboo shoots are used alone or with other vegetable in many stir-fried vegetable dishes. It may also be used as the sole vegetable ingredient in pork chop soup. Duck and bamboo shoot noodles (Bún măng vịt)  is also a famous noodle dish in Vietnam.

In Myanmar, bamboo shoots are called hmyit. They can be used in a soup called myahait hcaut tar la bot or talabaw, bamboo soup. The preparation of this dish generally follows three steps. First, the bamboo shoots are collected from a bamboo forest. Bamboo can be found in the whole of Myanmar but the bamboo shoots from the two northernmost regions (Kachin State and Sagaing Region) are soft and good in taste. The bamboo shoots are then boiled in water after which they can be cooked with curry powder, rice powder, and other ingredients such as snakehead fish and basil leaves. A small amount of rice and some shreds of meat or seafood may also be added. The soup was traditionally used by the Karen people as a supplement to rice, which was not readily or cheaply available to them. Talabaw is one of the most well known soups in Myanmar, and widely considered to be the essential dish of Karen cuisine. Another bamboo shoot dish in Burmese cuisine is a sour bamboo shoot curry called hmyit chin hin (မျှစ်ချဉ်ဟင်း), a specialty of Naypyidaw in central Burma.

In Indonesia, they are sliced thinly to be boiled with coconut milk and spices to make gulai rebung. Other recipes using bamboo shoots are sayur lodeh (mixed vegetables in coconut milk) and lun pia (sometimes written lumpia: fried wrapped bamboo shoots  with vegetables). The shoots of some species contain cyanide that must be leached or boiled out before they can be eaten safely. Slicing the bamboo shoots thinly assists in this leaching.

Gallery

See also 
 Takenoko-zoku
 Umami

References

External links

A short series on several edible bamboo species in Taiwan (Chinese)

Asian vegetables
Stem vegetables
Japanese vegetables
Vietnamese vegetables